Chloroclystis costicavata is a species of moth in the family Geometridae. It is found on Mauritius and Réunion.

The wingspan of this moth is approx. .
The edge of the forewings of the males have an convexed shape that makes it easy to distinguish them from the females.

Their larvae feed on the flowers of Lantana camara (Verbenaceae).

See also
List of moths of Mauritius
List of moths of Réunion

References

de Joannis, J. 1932b. Lépidoptères Hétérocères des Mascareignes. - — :427–456; pl. 23

External links

costicavata
Moths described in 1932
Moths of Mauritius
Moths of Réunion